Raashid Alvi, is an Indian politician who served as a member of the Indian Parliament from both the Lok Sabha and Rajya Sabha. He is currently a member of the Indian National Congress party.

Early life

Raashid Alvi was born in Chandpur, Bijnor, Uttar Pradesh, on 15 April 1956, to Islama Khatoon and Malik Irfan Ahmad Alvi, a freedom fighter

Political career 
He served as the All India general secretary of the Janata Dal   In 1999, he was elected to the Lok Sabha from the Amroha constituency in Uttar Pradesh, defeating former Test cricketer and Bharatiya Janata Party candidate Chetan Chauhan by over 90,000 votes. He had unsuccessfully contested the same seat in the 1996 elections. He served as the Parliamentary Party leader of the Bahujan Samaj Party from 1999 to 2004. He was expelled from the Bahujan Samaj Party in 2004 after he had accused party president Mayawati of working under BJP pressure and taking bribes for allotting party tickets.

He later joined the Congress party and was twice elected to the Rajya Sabha from Andhra Pradesh and served in the Indian Parliament from 2004–2012. He also served as an official spokesperson of the Indian National Congress. Alvi failed to get a Rajya Sabha renomination and was dropped as the party spokesperson in 2013.

References

External links
 
 Raashid Alvi's Profile on Jan Pratinidhi

Indian National Congress politicians
Lok Sabha members from Uttar Pradesh
Living people
21st-century Indian Muslims
1956 births
India MPs 1999–2004
Rajya Sabha members from Andhra Pradesh
Telugu politicians
Janata Dal politicians
Bahujan Samaj Party politicians from Uttar Pradesh
People from Bijnor district
People from Amroha district